Guillaume François Laennec (11 November 1748 – 8 February 1822) was a French physician, and the uncle of René Laennec, who he looked after as a child.

References

1748 births
1822 deaths
18th-century French physicians
19th-century French physicians